DSFM may refer to:

Franco-Manitoban School Division
Dublin South FM